Howard Dudley Hart (born August 4, 1968) is an American professional golfer with two PGA Tour wins in an injury-riddled career.

Early years
Hart was born in Rochester, New York.  He attended Archbishop Curley-Notre Dame High School in Miami, Florida.

College career
He accepted an athletic scholarship to attend the University of Florida in Gainesville, Florida, where he was a member of coach Lynn Blevin and coach Buddy Alexander's Florida Gators men's golf teams from 1987 to 1990.  He earned honors as the Southeastern Conference (SEC) Freshman of the Year (1987), a three-time first-team All-SEC selection, and a four-time All-American.  Hart was also a member of the Gators' 1989 SEC championship team.  He was inducted into the University of Florida Athletic Hall of Fame as a "Gator Great" in 2003.

Professional career
Hart turned pro in 1990 and joined the PGA Tour in 1991.  His first win came in 1996 at the rain-shortened Bell Canadian Open, his 160th PGA Tour start.  His second win was at the 2000 Honda Classic.  Hart also finished in a three-way tie for first in the 2004 EDS Byron Nelson Championship, which he and Robert Damron lost in a playoff to Sergio García.

Although Hart has only won two PGA tournaments, he was one of the most consistent players on the Tour.  From 1991 to 2009, Hart had 55 top-10 finishes, including four runner-up finishes.  His best finish in a major was sixth place tie at the 1993 PGA Championship.  He was injured in 2003 and had to limit his play to twenty-two starts due to a herniated disc in his back.  In 2007, Hart had to take six months off from the Tour in order to care for his wife and children while his wife, Suzanne, had a softball-sized tumor removed from her lungs.  He played on the Tour in 2008 using a major medical exemption.  In what turned out to be his best year ever, Hart earned more than $2 million and was awarded the Tour's Comeback of the Year award.  His career high Official World Golf Ranking is 21st, achieved in April 2000.

In 2009, Hart had spinal fusion surgery, which prevented him from playing on the PGA Tour in 2010 and 2011. He attempted a comeback at the 2011 Australian Open, but was forced to withdraw after three rounds. He attempted one event in 2012, the AT&T Pebble Beach National Pro-Am, but missed the cut and made no PGA Tour starts in 2013 after additional back surgery. He was granted 12 more starts to earn $504,824 and satisfy a Major Medical Exemption in order to regain his Tour card.

In 2013, Hart played in Canada (missed cut at Wildfire Invitational) and Argentina (T13 at Personal Classic, his first professional cut since May 2009). In 2014, Hart made his first PGA Tour cut in almost five years, at the AT&T Pebble Beach National Pro-Am with a T35 finish. Overall, Hart made four PGA Tour starts (made two cuts) and tried to use his medical extension to play on the Web.com Tour Finals, but did not make a cut. He entered the 2014–15 season with eight starts and $464,067 to retain his PGA Tour card. He was unable to satisfy his medical exemption and demoted to the Past Champions category.

Hart became eligible for PGA Tour Champions in August 2018.

Personal
Hart purchased Lake Shore Golf Club in Rochester, New York with his father and Jeff Sluman.  Hart is the father of triplets: Ryan, Rachel and Abigail were born on December 6, 2001.  He enjoys fishing and reading, and is a fan of professional hockey.  He currently lives in Buffalo, New York.

Professional wins (6)

PGA Tour wins (2)

*Note: The 1996 Bell Canadian Open was shortened to 54 holes due to weather.

PGA Tour playoff record (0–1)

Other wins (4)
1990 Florida Open, Louisiana Open
1998 Subaru Sarazen World Open (unofficial event in Georgia, USA)
2002 CVS Charity Classic (with Chris DiMarco)

Results in major championships

WD = withdrew
CUT = missed the half-way cut
"T" indicates a tie for a place

Summary

Most consecutive cuts made – 5 (2001 Masters – 2002 U.S. Open)
Longest streak of top-10s – 1 (twice)

Results in The Players Championship

CUT = missed the halfway cut
WD = withdrew
"T" indicates a tie for a place

Results in World Golf Championships

1Cancelled due to 9/11

QF, R16, R32, R64 = Round in which player lost in match play
"T" = Tied
NT = No tournament
Note that the HSBC Champions did not become a WGC event until 2009.

Results in senior major championships

"T" indicates a tie for a place
WD = withdrew
NT = No tournament due to COVID-19 pandemic

See also 

1990 PGA Tour Qualifying School graduates
1994 PGA Tour Qualifying School graduates
List of Florida Gators men's golfers on the PGA Tour
List of golfers with most PGA Tour wins
List of University of Florida Athletic Hall of Fame members

References

External links 

American male golfers
Florida Gators men's golfers
PGA Tour golfers
PGA Tour Champions golfers
Golfers from New York (state)
Golfers from Miami
Archbishop Curley-Notre Dame High School alumni
Sportspeople from Rochester, New York
Sportspeople from Buffalo, New York
People from Clarence, New York
1968 births
Living people